Florian Tardieu (born 22 April 1992) is a French professional footballer who plays as a midfielder for Ligue 1 club Troyes.

Career
Tardieu made his debut for FC Istres, his first professional club, in the 1–0 win against Bastia on 18 May 2012, coming on as a late substitute for Laurent Agouazi. Tardieu scored his first senior goal in the 1–0 home victory over Chamois Niortais on 31 August 2012 on his first league start for Istres. Tardieu signed for French second tier FC Sochaux in the summer of 2014 for four years.

He then signed for three years in June 2018 for Belgian first tier Zulte Waregem.

References

External links

Florian Tardieu career statistics at foot-national.com

1992 births
Living people
French footballers
Association football midfielders
FC Istres players
FC Sochaux-Montbéliard players
S.V. Zulte Waregem players
ES Troyes AC players
Ligue 2 players
Belgian Pro League players
French expatriate footballers
French expatriate sportspeople in Belgium
Expatriate footballers in Belgium